Dream Maker is an American webseries starring Audrina Patridge.

Dream Maker may also refer to:

Dream Maker (album), a 1982 album by Conway Twitty
The Dream Maker, an alternate name for the 1963 British musical film It's All Happening
The Dream Makers, a 1975 American television film starring James Franciscus
The Dream Makers (TV series), a Singaporean series
The Dream Makers II, a sequel series to the Singaporean show
Dreamaker, a Spanish band
Dream Maker Entertainment, a division of the South Korean entertainment company SM Entertainment
Dream Maker (TV program), a 2022 Philippine reality television show.